Micro pitting is a fatigue failure of the surface of a material commonly seen in rolling bearings and gears.
It is also known as grey staining, micro spalling or frosting.

Pitting and micropitting
The difference between pitting corrosion and micropitting is the size of the pits after surface fatigue. Pits formed by micropitting are approximately 10-20 μm in depth, and micropitted metal often has a frosted or gray appearance. Normal pitting creates larger and more visible pits. Micropits are originated from the local contact of asperities produced by improper lubrication.

Causes
In a normal bearing the surfaces are separated by a layer of oil, this is known as elastohydrodynamic (EHD) lubrication. If the thickness of the EHD film is of the same order of magnitude as the surface roughness, the surface topography is able to interact and cause micro pitting. A thin EHD film may be caused by excess load or temperature, a lower oil viscosity than is required, low speed or water in the oil. Water in the oil can make micro pitting worse by causing hydrogen embrittlement of the surface. Micro pitting occurs only under poor EHD lubrication conditions.

A surface with a deep scratch might break exactly at the scratch if stress is applied. One can imagine that the surface roughness is a composite of many very small scratches. So high surface roughness decreases the stability on heavy stressed parts. To get a good overview of the surface an areal scan (Surface metrology) gives more information that a measurement along a single profile (profileometer). To quantify the surface roughness the ISO 25178 can be used.

See also
Pitting corrosion
Corrosion

Corrosion
Materials degradation